The Aue is a left, southwestern, tributary of the Oste in northern Lower Saxony, Germany.

Geography 
Before the construction of the  the Aue was the natural outlet of the  lake in the southwest part of the parish of Wingst on the southern edge of the collective municipality of Am Dobrock. The Balksee is, in turn, fed by several streams. The Aue today no longer has any direct link with the Balksee and rises on its northern edge. The Aue, as a former sea creek, has no natural gradient. The water level is artificially held below sea level by dyke sluices and a pumping station.

Tributaries 
 Rönne
 Neuhaus-Bülkau Canal (most of the water from the Balksee and the old drainage basin of the Aue flows through this canal)
 Sprengeauswettern
 Splethauswettern

See also 
List of rivers of Lower Saxony

References

Rivers of Lower Saxony
Rivers of Germany